Danijel Koncilja (born 4 September 1990) is a Slovenian male volleyball player who plays for ACH Volley. With the Slovenian national team, he competed at the 2015 Men's European Volleyball Championship.

References

1990 births
Living people
Slovenian men's volleyball players
Place of birth missing (living people)
Slovenian expatriate sportspeople in Austria
Expatriate volleyball players in Austria
Slovenian expatriate sportspeople in Italy
Expatriate volleyball players in Italy
Slovenian expatriate sportspeople in France
Expatriate volleyball players in France
AS Cannes Volley-Ball players